Michael Swinton "Bruce" Tulloh (29 September 1935 – 28 April 2018) was a long-distance runner from England.

Athletics career
He won the European title in the men's 5000 metres at the 1962 European Championships in Belgrade, Yugoslavia with a winning time of 14:00.6. He was also part of a national title winning team Portsmouth A.C. in cross-country and road running in the 1960s. He was famous for running barefoot in many of his races. His twin daughters were teenage running phenomena in the 1980s setting age-best marks running for their club Swindon A.C. They also ran barefoot.

He represented England in the 1 mile and 3 mile races at the 1962 British Empire and Commonwealth Games in Perth, Western Australia. Four years later he competed in the 3 mile and 6 mile races at the 1966 British Empire and Commonwealth Games.

In 1969, Tulloh ran 2876 miles across America from Los Angeles to New York City in 64 days. This is described in his book Four Million Footsteps, published by Pelham Books and as a Mayflower paperback in 1970.

He was coach to British marathon athlete Richard Nerurkar.

Personal life
He taught biology at The Bulmershe School, Dr Challoner's Grammar School and then Marlborough College for 20 years.

He wrote a book, Running is Easy, that is essentially an amateur's guide to becoming a good runner.

Tulloh also wrote for Runner's World. One of his most important contributions was a three-fold training programme for the ten-mile race (16.1km): the first programme was how to get sub-80 mins (4:58 per km), the second was for sub-70 mins (4:21 per km) and the third for sub-60 mins (3:44 per km).

Death
Tullloh died at his home in Marlborough on 28 April 2018. He was 82.

Publications

See also
 Barefoot running

References

1935 births
2018 deaths
People from Datchet
English male long-distance runners
Olympic athletes of Great Britain
Athletes (track and field) at the 1960 Summer Olympics
Commonwealth Games competitors for England
Athletes (track and field) at the 1962 British Empire and Commonwealth Games
Athletes (track and field) at the 1966 British Empire and Commonwealth Games
European Athletics Championships medalists
Japan Championships in Athletics winners
Deaths from cancer in England